Brian Jamaal Jones (born January 17, 1978 in Los Angeles, California) is an American professional basketball who played for EnBW Ludwigsburg of the Basketball Bundesliga league.

Player career 
1996/01  Santa Clara Broncos
2003/05  Walter Tigers Tübingen
2005/07  Eisbären Bremerhaven
2007/08  Plus Pujol Lleida
2008/09  EnBW Ludwigsburg

Honours 

Walter Tigers Tübingen

2.Bundesliga ProA Champion
2006

External links
Official CB Lleida website
Brian Jones profile

1978 births
Living people
American expatriate basketball people in Germany
American expatriate basketball people in Spain
American men's basketball players
Eisbären Bremerhaven players
Point guards
Santa Clara Broncos men's basketball players
Basketball players from Los Angeles
Tigers Tübingen players